Come and Join Us is the second studio album of the Christian rock band Petra. It was released in 1977.

The album continues with a style similar to the one of their previous album, which is something between country and Southern rock. However, the music is more rock-oriented,  and the lyrics show more depth.

Also - like their previous album - there is no lead singer per se. Instead, the lead vocals are handled by guitarists Bob Hartman and Greg Hough, and some guest singers. One of the guest singers is Greg X. Volz who later became the band's full-time singer.

Producing 
Bob Hartman wanted to title the album "God Gave Rock and Roll to You", after one of the songs. This song was written by Russ Ballard for his band Argent, and later became a rock music anthem, covered by other bands like KISS (1991) and Bride (1993). However, Myrrh Records deemed it to be inappropriate and forced Hartman to change the title. Petra would cover that song again in 1984 on their seventh album, Beat the System.

Another drawback for Hartman was the exclusion of the song "Killing My Old Man". It was recorded for this album, but was dropped by Myrrh before the album was released. The song remained a staple in concert, though, and was eventually recorded for the 1981 album, Never Say Die.

Track listing 
All songs written by Bob Hartman, except where noted.

Vinyl 

Side one
 "God Gave Rock 'n' Roll to You" (Russ Ballard) – 5:35
 "Holy Ghost Power" – 2:26
 "Woman Don't You Know" (Hartman & Hough) – 3:39
 "Sally" (Greg Hough) – 4:25
 "Come and Join Us" – 4:39
Side two
 "Where Can I Go" – 3:51
 "Without You" (Hough) – 4:27
 "Ask Him In" – 3:30
 "God Gave Rock and Roll to You" (reprise) (Ballard) – 2:48

CD 

 "God Gave Rock 'n' Roll to You" (Russ Ballard) – 5:35
 "Ask Him In" – 3:30
 "Sally" (Greg Hough) – 4:25
 "Without You I Would Surely Die" (Hough) – 4:27
 "Come and Join Us" – 4:39
 "Where Can I Go" – 3:51
 "Holy Ghost Power" – 2:26
 "Woman Don't You Know" (Hartman & Hough) – 3:39
 "God Gave Rock and Roll to You" (reprise) (Ballard) – 2:48

Note: The 2011 reissue on Wounded Bird Records (on one disc with Petra) restores the original (i.e. vinyl) running order.

Cover art 
The cover art was done by Dennis Bellile while the band's logo was designed by Craig Yoe (Yoe-Yoe Studio).

Personnel 

Petra
 Bob Hartman - guitar, vocals
 Greg Hough - guitar, vocals
 John DeGroff - bass guitar

Guest musicians
 Bill Glover - drums, percussion
 Steve McElyea - keyboards
 Steve Mergen - percussion
 Allen C. Hornung - percussion
 Steve Pfeiffer - percussion
 Cowbell Bob - percussion
 Houghie I - percussion
 Steve Camp - percussion, guest vocals
 Greg X. Volz - guest vocals
 Karen Morrison - guest vocals
 Austin Roberts - guest vocals

 Recording 
 Terry Jamison - engineer
 Allen C. Hornung, Bill Olszewski - assistant engineer
 Arrangements by Petra
 Recorded at Golden Voice Studios, South Pekin, Illinois
 Mastered by Lanky Linstrot, ABC Records, Los Angeles, California

Production
 Austin Roberts - Producer

Notes 

1977 albums
Petra (band) albums